Bernardino Bilbao Rioja (20 May 1895 in Arampampa  – 13 May 1983 in La Paz) was a Bolivian officer who served during the Chaco War (1932–35). He pioneered the use of air forces in combat (the first to be used in this capacity in South America).

Bilbao had already made enemies among his cohorts when he refused to participate in the 1930 coup against President of Bolivia Hernando Siles Reyes. This enmity led him to be vetoed for most major promotions within the military, both during the war and after. One of the reasons for the 1934 military uprising that toppled the Constitutional President Daniel Salamanca Urey was the latter's desire to replace the ineffective current commanders with Generals Lanza and Bilbao Rioja at the head of the army.

After the war, Bilbao's popularity converted him into a potential enemy to the aspirations of the likes of Col. David Toro Ruilova and Gen. Enrique Peñaranda. In particular, it was rumored that Bilbao would present himself in the 1940 elections against Peñaranda, a prospect that obviously troubled Peñaranda's supporters in the "Concordancia" (the agglomeration of most of the oligarchic, old-style parties united behind one candidate). Thus, Bilbao was promptly detained and then flown to exile in Chile. But he eventually returned, and indeed, ran for President in 1951 and 1966, both times representing the right-of-center Bolivian Socialist Falange. In the 1951 election, he placed third while Víctor Paz Estenssoro of the Revolutionary Nationalist Movement came first; the anti-system MNR and FSB won a combined majority of the vote, which was to be followed by the 1952 Revolution.

In 1966, he finished a distant second to René Barrientos. Despite losing both elections, he remained a popular and respected figure.

Bilbao Rioja died in La Paz on May 13, 1983, at age 87.

References

External links 
Law N.0824 

1895 births
1983 deaths
20th-century Bolivian politicians
Bolivian generals
Bolivian Socialist Falange politicians
Candidates in the 1940 Bolivian presidential election
Candidates in the 1951 Bolivian presidential election
Candidates in the 1966 Bolivian presidential election
Military College of the Army alumni
People from Bernardino Bilbao Province
People of the Chaco War